The Price of Sugar is a 2007 Uncommon Productions film directed by Bill Haney and produced by Haney and Eric Grunebaum about exploitation of Haitian immigrants in the Dominican Republic involved with production of sugar, and the efforts of Spanish priest Father Christopher Hartley to ameliorate their situation.  It is narrated by actor Paul Newman. The documentary shows the poor working conditions in the sugar cane plantations, and political control exerted by the Vicini family to stifle efforts to change the situation.

While the documentary highlights the efforts of Father Christopher Hartley to bring medicine, education, and human rights to Haitian workers, it also shows the widespread resentment of his actions held by Dominican people.

Critical reception

The documentary won the audience award at the 2007 South by Southwest Film Festival.

On November 19, 2007, The Price of Sugar was named by the Academy of Motion Picture Arts and Sciences as one of 15 films on its documentary feature Oscar shortlist.

The documentary did not make the nomination list for the Oscar Documentary Feature category.

Defamation lawsuit
Subjects of the film, Felipe and Juan Vicini Lluberes, filed a defamation suit on August 31, 2007 against Uncommon Productions and producer Bill Haney, alleging 53 factual inaccuracies.  According to Read McCaffrey, a partner in the law firm Patton Boggs representing the Vicinis,'The misrepresentation are very egregious and as deceptive as I have seen in a very long time.'" However, according to the First Circuit Court of Appeals, the Vicini family "later winnowed the number of allegedly defamatory statements down to seven". The Appeals Court upheld a judgment from a lower court that the Vicini brothers were "public figures under the circumstances". The brothers thus must prove that the filmmakers made false depictions and knew about it. If they had been private figures, as the plaintiffs had unsuccessfully tried to prove, the filmmakers could have been liable for publishing information without verifying its truth. The appeals court sent the case back to the lower court to decide if the filmmakers have to hand over a report that they prepared to obtain insurance coverage for the film. After that, the lower court can determine whether information shown in the film was false and, if it was the case, if the filmmakers knew about it.

Improvement of living conditions
According to a report by NPR, the living conditions of Haitian workers depicted in the film have improved to some extent soon after the film. New houses with electricity and water have been built together with rural clinics. The guards no longer carry guns, and the Haitians can leave the plantation.  

More recent service workers from the U.S. who have traveled to the La Romana region of the Dominican Republic to partner with the Good Samaritan Hospital in providing relief efforts to the bateyes report different findings. In the network of more than 200 bateyes around La Romana, more than 50% have undrinkable water. Most do not have electricity. Guards are often seen with firearms. While Haitians are allowed to leave the plantations, they lack the financial resources and/or relationships to do so. Malnutrition and dehydration are the number one causes of death among children.

See also 
Uncommon Productions

References

External links

New York Times Review of the film

Documentary films about poverty
2007 films
Documentary films about the labor movement
Documentary films about sugar
2007 documentary films
Documentary films about immigration
Films set in Haiti
Films set in the Dominican Republic
Films shot in Haiti
Films shot in the Dominican Republic
Haitian Creole-language films
2000s English-language films
2000s Spanish-language films
2007 multilingual films